Sphaerodactylus levinsi, also known commonly as the Desecheo gecko or the  Isla Desecheo least gecko, is a species of lizard in the family Sphaerodactylidae . The species is endemic to Desecheo Island in Puerto Rico.

Etymology
The specific name, levinsi, is in honor of American theoretical ecologist Richard Levins.

Habitat
The preferred habitat of S. levinsi is forest at altitudes of

Description

Reproduction
S. levinsi is oviparous.

References

Further reading
Heatwole H (1968). "Herpetogeography of Puerto Rico. V. Description of a New Species of Sphaerodactylus from Desecheo Island". Breviora (292): 1–6. (Sphaerodactylus levins, new species).
Meier AJ, Noble RE (1990). "Notes on the Status and Habits of the Desecheo Gecko, Sphaerodactylus levinsi ". Journal of Herpetology 24 (4): 426–428).
Rösler H (2000). "Kommentierte Liste der rezent, subrezent und fossil bekannten Geckotaxa (Reptilia: Gekkonomorpha) ". Gekkota 2: 28–153. (Sphaerodactylus levinsi, p. 112). (in German).
Schwartz A, Henderson RW (1991). Amphibians and Reptiles of the West Indies: Descriptions, Distributions, and Natural History. Gainesville, Florida: University of Florida Press. 720 pp. . (Sphaerodactylus levinsi, p. 504).
Schwartz A, Thomas R (1975). A Check-list of West Indian Amphibians and Reptiles. Carnegie Museum of Natural History Special Publication No. 1. Pittsburgh, Pennsylvania: Carnegie Museum of Natural History. 216 pp. (Sphaerodactylus levinsi, p. 153).

Sphaerodactylus
Reptiles of Puerto Rico
Endemic fauna of Puerto Rico
Reptiles described in 1968
Taxa named by Harold F. Heatwole